The 2011 Men's Indoor Hockey World Cup was the third edition of the Men's Indoor Hockey World Cup for men. It was played from 8 February through 13 February 2011 in Poznań, Poland. For the first time in history, teams from five continents were represented.

Germany was the two-time defending champion and won it for the third time.

Results

Pools

Pool A

Pool B

Classification

Eleventh and twelfth place

Ninth and tenth place

Seventh and eighth place

Fifth and sixth place

First to fourth place classification

Semi-finals

Third and fourth place

Final

Statistics

Final standings

Awards
Most Valuable Player: 
Top Scorer: 
Best Goalkeeper: 
Best U21 Player:

References

External links

Indoor Hockey World Cup
World Cup
Indoor Hockey World Cup Men
International indoor hockey competitions hosted by Poland
Sport in Poznań
21st century in Poznań
Indoor Hockey World Cup

pl:Halowe Mistrzostwa Świata w Hokeju na Trawie 2011#Mężczyźni